Australian rules most often refers to the sport Australian rules football.

Australian rules may also refer to:

 Australian Rules (film), a 2002 Australian film

See also
 Australian Football League
 Football in Australia